Rhodostemonodaphne is a genus of flowering plants in the family Lauraceae. It is a neotropical genus  consisting of approximately 41 species occurring in Central America and northern South America. This genus has many species that are valued for timber. The classification of the genus is unclear since the species in the genus fall into a well-supported but unresolved clade that also includes species with unisexual flowers currently placed in the genera Endlicheria and part of Ocotea.

Description
Rhodostemonodaphne are shrubs and trees up to 30 m tall, mostly hardwood evergreen trees. They are dioecious (male and female flowers are on separate trees). The stamens have four locelli situated in a shallow arch towards the apex of the anthers.
The leaves are alternately arranged, elliptic with recurved margins, and thin (chartaceous).
The inflorescence of small flowers is a panicle with racemose terminations.

Species
Species include:
Rhodostemonodaphne anomala (Mez) Rohwer
Rhodostemonodaphne avilensis Madriñán
Rhodostemonodaphne capixabensis Baitello & Coe-Teix.
Rhodostemonodaphne celiana (C.K.Allen) Rohwer
Rhodostemonodaphne crenaticupula Madriñán
Rhodostemonodaphne curicuriariensis Madriñán
Rhodostemonodaphne dioica (Mez) Rohwer
Rhodostemonodaphne elephantopus Madriñán
Rhodostemonodaphne juruensis (A.C. Sm.) Chanderbali
Rhodostemonodaphne kunthiana (Nees) Rohwer
Rhodostemonodaphne laxa Rohwer
Rhodostemonodaphne leptoclada Madriñán
Rhodostemonodaphne licanioides (A.C. Sm.) Madriñán
Rhodostemonodaphne longiflora Madriñán
Rhodostemonodaphne macrocalyx (Meisn.) Rohwer ex Madriñán
Rhodostemonodaphne miranda (Sandwith) Rohwer
Rhodostemonodaphne mirecolorata (C.K. Allen) Rohwer
Rhodostemonodaphne morii Madriñán
Rhodostemonodaphne napoensis Madriñán
Rhodostemonodaphne negrensis Madriñán
Rhodostemonodaphne ovatifolia Madriñán
Rhodostemonodaphne parvifolia Madriñán
Rhodostemonodaphne peneia Madriñán
Rhodostemonodaphne praeclara (Sandwith) Madriñán
Rhodostemonodaphne recurva van der Werff
Rhodostemonodaphne revolutifolia Madriñán
Rhodostemonodaphne rufovirgata Madriñán
Rhodostemonodaphne scandens Madriñán
Rhodostemonodaphne sordida Madriñán
Rhodostemonodaphne steyermarkiana (C.K.Allen) van der Werff
Rhodostemonodaphne synandra van der Werff
Rhodostemonodaphne tumucumaquensis Madriñán
Rhodostemonodaphne velutina (Mez) Madriñán

References 

Lauraceae genera
Dioecious plants
Neotropical realm flora
Lauraceae